Antony Papadopoulos (born 12 November 2002) is an English professional footballer who plays as a midfielder for Bowers & Pitsea on loan from National League South side Welling United.

Playing career
Previously a member of Leyton Orient's academy, and club Youth Team Player of the Year, Papadopoulos signed his first professional contract with the club in May 2021.

Prior to his professional contract being signed, Papadopoulos went on a work experience loan at Harlow Town in October 2020, making four appearances in total before the early curtailment of the season in December, due to the COVID-19 pandemic.

Papadopoulos made his senior debut for Orient in the EFL Trophy at home to Southampton U21 on 14 September 2021. He scored the winning goal in the 82nd minute as Orient won 1–0. He then started in Orient's next two matches in the tournament, the 4–0 win at Crawley Town on 5 October, and the 1–0 win over Charlton Athletic on 9 November, in which he was sent off. Papadopoulos was released at the end of the 2021–22 season.

On 27 July 2022, Papadopoulos signed for National League South club Welling United. In January 2023, he joined Bowers & Pitsea on an initial one-month loan deal.

Personal life
Papadopoulos is of Greek descent.

Statistics

References

External links

2002 births
Living people
English footballers
Association football midfielders
Leyton Orient F.C. players
Harlow Town F.C. players
Welling United F.C. players
Bowers & Pitsea F.C. players
Isthmian League players
National League (English football) players